Mithapukur Mosque is an early 19th-century mosque in Mithapukur, Bangladesh. Evidence shows it was built in the Mughal period, and in recent years the Department of Archeology has listed it as an archaeological monument of Bangladesh.

The Mosque is located around half a mile northwest of Mithapukur at the upazila headquarters.

History 
According to inscriptions, the mosque was built by Sheikh Mohammed Asin, the son of Sheikh Sabir and grandson of Sheikh Moazzam. It was completed on a Friday, in 1226 AH (Muslim year) (1811 AD).

Architecture 
The mosque has a rectangular base and three domes.

Location 
The mosque is found on Rangpur-Bogra highway, 4 km south of the town of Rangpur District.

References

Mosques in Bangladesh